Wilmington College may refer to:
Wilmington College (Delaware), now Wilmington University
University of North Carolina at Wilmington, formerly Wilmington College
Wilmington College (Ohio)